The Ford Trophy is the main domestic List A limited overs cricket competition in New Zealand. Previous sponsor State Insurance did not renew naming rights in 2009, resulting in the competition being renamed the New Zealand Cricket one-day competition. The competition was renamed the Ford Trophy following a partnership between New Zealand Cricket and Ford Motor Company in 2011.

Tournament name

Since its commencement in 1971/72, the competition has had several sponsors, each one exercising its naming rights. The competition has been known as:
New Zealand Motor Corporation Knock-Out – from 1971–72 to 1976–77  
Gillette Cup – from 1977–78 to 1978–79 
National Knock-Out – from 1979 to 1980 
Shell Cup – from 1980–81 to 2000–01 
State Shield – from 2001–02 to 2008–09
New Zealand One-Day Cricket Competition – from 2009–10 to 2010–11
The Ford Trophy – from 2011–12 to present

Format

Between 1971–72 and 1979–80, the competition was played on a knock-out basis with a preliminary round, semi-finals and a final. From 1980–81 to 1984–85 the competition was played in a league format with all six teams playing each other once and the top two teams playing off in a final. Between 1985–86 and 1988–89, the side on top of the league after a single round-robin were declared champions. Semi-Finals and Finals were re-introduced from 1989 to 1990 onwards. From 1993–to 94 teams played each other home and away (10 matches) in the league format. From the 2009/10 season onward teams play each other once (five games) followed by three randomly selected teams a second time, forming an eight-game round-robin.

Games in the competition consist of 50 6-ball overs. The competition was originally 40 8-ball overs per innings until 1979–80 when overs throughout the world were standardized to 6 balls.

Teams

Winners

See also

 Plunket Shield
 Hallyburton Johnstone Shield
 Men's Super Smash
 Women's Super Smash

References

 Association of Cricket Statisticians International Cricket Year Book 1996 – compiled by Philip Bailey

External links
 Scorecard for the New Zealand Motor Corporation Knockout Tournament Final Canterbury v Wellington in Christchurch, December 1971 – Cricket Archive.com

New Zealand domestic cricket competitions
List A cricket competitions